FS Gelko Hasselt is a Belgian futsal team from Hasselt, playing in the Belgian Futsal Division 1.

The club was founded in 2016.

Kit
The team is sponsored by Joma.

Current squad 2018/19

Current squad as at:

References

External links
https://web.archive.org/web/20170727192429/https://www.fs-gelko-hasselt.be/

Futsal in Belgium